Casolani is a surname. Notable people with the surname include:

Alessandro Casolani (1552–1606), Italian painter
Annetto Casolani (1815–1866), Maltese Roman Catholic bishop
Cristoforo Casolani (c. 1552–after 1606), Italian painter
Ilario Casolani (1588–1661), Italian painter
Niccolò Casolani (1659–1714), Italian painter

See also
Casolari